Anna Gerasimou (born 15 October 1987) is a retired Greek tennis player. When she was young, she moved from her birthplace Kavala to Athens in order to pursue a career in tennis.

Gerasimou competed in the women's doubles at the 2008 Summer Olympics with partner Eleni Daniilidou, and lost in the first round to the Swiss team of Emmanuelle Gagliardi and Patty Schnyder. Coached by George Kalovelonis, her highest career singles ranking was 200, which she achieved on 9 March 2009. She has qualified for a WTA Tour main draw twice, both in 2010, in Pattaya City, and in the Malaysia Open in Kuala Lumpur. She also had one WTA doubles main-draw appearance, in Pattaya City in 2010, where she reached the quarterfinals. She retired from tennis 2010.

ITF Circuit finals

Singles: 15 (7 titles, 8 runner-ups)

Doubles: 5 (3 titles, 2 runner-ups)

External links
 
 
 Athlete bio at 2008 Olympics site

1987 births
Living people
Greek female tennis players
Sportspeople from Kavala
Olympic tennis players of Greece
Tennis players at the 2008 Summer Olympics